The National Premier Leagues Northern NSW is a regional Australian Professional association football league comprising teams from Northern New South Wales. As a subdivision of the National Premier Leagues, the league sits at Level 1 on the Northern New South Wales league system (Level 2 of the overall Australian league system). The competition is administered by Northern NSW Football, the governing body of the sport in the northern region of the state (the southern region is mostly governed by Football NSW). Prior to 2014, the league was formerly known as the Northern NSW State Football League.

History
The league originally started with 12 teams, all with a first grade, reserve grade and youth grade team. The league was then downsized to 10 teams still with all three grades. For the 2009 season it was decided by Northern New South Wales Football (the governing body) to downsize the league once again to 8 teams in order to improve the quality and give local players a chance to enter the A-league through the competition. The teams competing in the 2009 season were decided on the second of September 2008, with Highfields Azzurri FC and Lake Macquarie City Roosters FC being relegated to the Northern NSW Division One.

Teams were judged on criteria which included facilities/ground (30%), financial status (25%), management (20%), playing strength/coaching staff (15%) and development program (10%). An independent body, chaired by former NSW gaming minister Richard Face, was assigned to make the decision.

From the 2017 season onward the competition once again expanded to 11 teams with Lake Macquarie being promoted from the HIT Northern League One (formerly 'NewFM Football League').

From the 2020 season onward the competition contracted back to 10 teams after Newcastle Jets Youth transferred into the NPL New South Wales structure, now playing in the NPL NSW 4 competition. The reason was because the Newcastle Jets and Northern NSW Football believed that transferring the Youth Jets to the Sydney-centred competition would help develop their youth players.

From the 2022 season onward the competition once again expanded to 11 teams with the inclusion of Cooks Hill United being promoted from the HIT Northern League One.

Format
The competition consists of 11 teams from around the Newcastle, Hunter and Lake Macquarie area who each have a 1st-division side, a reserve/u20's team, u18's team and youth teams. A season takes place over 18 rounds, with each team playing each other at home and away. The team that finishes 1st at the end of 18 rounds is declared the minor premier and qualifies for the National Premier Leagues Finals Series. The top 5 teams at the end of 18 rounds contest in a finals series, a home and away knockout system played with the away goals rule, with the winners meeting in the grand final. The winner of the grand final is crowned as the major premier.

Nominally the last-placed team each year is relegated to the HIT Northern League One, however promotion/relegation has been placed on hold indefinitely until Northern League One clubs are eligible to play in the NPL competition.

Clubs
The following 11 clubs will compete in the National Premier Leagues Northern NSW during the 2022 season.

Honours NNSW NPL

Honours pre-NPL (1999-2013)

Notes

References

External links
 Northern NSW Football website
 Oz Football Northern NSW Statistics

Soccer leagues in New South Wales
National Premier Leagues